The Singapore International Photography Festival (SIPF) is a non-profit biennial festival organised by Singapore-based independent art space, DECK. Its first edition, held in October 2008, was the first event of its kind in Southeast Asia, with its programmes emphasising new photography in Southeast Asia and showcasing photographic works from Artists from the region alongside international peers at various venues across Singapore.

The three main festival components are the Ooficial exhibitions, workshops and portfolio review session for selected Southeast Asian photographers. Alongside, SIPF fringe activities are carried out at various arts galleries, arts spaces and education institutions to promote photography across Singapore. In 2012, SIPF has expanded its education programme with "Magnum Mentorship Singapore" a partnership with Magnum Photos Agency, and "Conversation with Black Box"  a series of visual literacy activities for school students.

Festival Curators
In each festival edition, SIPF invites arts professionals from all around the world to take part in the festival as Curators and portfolio reviewers. The selection of the Open Call submissions for the festival exhibitions are decided by the curators, independently of the festival organisers.

2014 
 Dr Adele Tan (Singapore) 
 Alexander Supartono (Indonesia)
 Dr Charles Merewether (Australia/Singapore) 
 Tay Kay Chin (Singapore)

2012 
 Alejandro Castellote (Spain)
 Patricia Levasseur de la Motte (France/Singapore)
 Zeng Han (China)

2010 
 Ark Fongsmut (Thailand) 
 Bridget Tracy Tan (Thailand) 
 Chow Chee Yong (Singapore) 
 Yasufumi Nakamori (Japan/USA)

2008 
 Ark Fongsmut (Thailand)
 Chow Chee Yong (Singapore)
 Terence Yeung (Singapore)
 Wang Xi (China)

Official Exhibitions 
There are two types of official exhibitions: The Open Call Showcase and the Special Showcase. The Open Call Showcase focusses on photographic works selected from international submissions. The invited curators of the festival will meet in Singapore to make the selection, and to discuss on the curation of the works across various public venues in Singapore. Special Showcase are by invitation and often related to the core public programme in the festival. The duration of the exhibition ranges from 3 weeks to 3 months depending on the venues partners in each edition of the festival.

SIPF Open Call Showcase 
In its 3rd SIPF Open Call, the exhibitions presented works by 50 emerging and established photographers from 25 countries such as Cambodia, Spain, Mexico, Peru, and Thailand.

2012 Showcased Photographers

References

Festivals in Singapore
Photography festivals
Art festivals in Singapore